Aleksy is a given name, and may refer to:

 Aleksy Antkiewicz (1923–2005), famous Polish boxer
 Aleksy Ćwiakowski (1895–1953), Polish political activist
 Aleksy Kuziemski (born 1977), boxer
 Maciej Aleksy Dawidowski (1920–1943), Polish Scoutmaster

See also

 Aleksi (disambiguation)
 Aleksis (disambiguation)
 Alexey (disambiguation)
 Alexis (disambiguation)
 Alexy (disambiguation)
 Alexie (disambiguation)